Gould Airfield was an airfield south of Batchelor Airfield at Batchelor, Northern Territory, Australia during World War II.

1945 Lockheed Ventura crash
On 27 January 1945, a RAAF Lockheed Ventura crashed 800 yards south-east of the airfield, killing all 6 crew members on board.

See also
 List of airports in the Northern Territory

References

Sources
National Archives of Australia

Former Royal Australian Air Force bases
World War II airfields in Australia
Defunct airports in the Northern Territory